The Laurence Olivier Award for Best Revival is an annual award presented by the Society of London Theatre in recognition of achievements in commercial London theatre. The awards were established as the Society of West End Theatre Awards in 1976, and renamed in 1984 in honour of English actor and director Laurence Olivier.

This award was introduced in 1991, presented through to 1995, set aside from 1996 to 2002, and reintroduced for the 2003 Olivier Awards.

Winners and nominees

1990s

2000s

2010s

2020s

Multiple awards and nominations

Awards 
2 awards

 Hedda Gabler

Nominations 
4 nominations

 A Streetcar Named Desire

3 nominations

 The Crucible
 Hamlet
 Macbeth

2 nominations

 Death of a Salesman
 Hedda Gabler
 King Lear
 Twelfth Night
 Uncle Vanya
 A View from the Bridge
 Who's Afraid of Virginia Woolf?
 The Winter's Tale

See also
 Tony Award for Best Revival of a Play

References

External links
 

Revival